The Society for the Protection of Animals Abroad (SPANA) is an international charity based in the United Kingdom, that works to provide veterinary care to working animals, including donkeys, horses, elephants and camels.

SPANA's works to improve the welfare of working animals in low-income countries. As part of its 2018–2022 strategic plan, it aims to support working animals' welfare through a combination of treatment, training and teaching. The charity treats animals who are suffering from injury and illness, or facing emergency situations, through its free provision of veterinary care delivered from a network of hospitals and mobile clinics. It trains animal owners and vets, promoting best practice and care, and teaches children that animals must be treated with care and compassion through its humane education program. 

In 2020, SPANA treated over 283,000 animals in 30 countries, including Morocco, Mali, Mauritania, Botswana, Tunisia, Zimbabwe, Ethiopia, South Africa and Jordan.

SPANA is funded entirely by voluntary donations. In 2020, the charity had a global expenditure of £7,960,014.

SPANA's registered charity number is 209015.

History
SPANA was founded in 1923 by British woman Kate Hosali and her daughter, Nina. While travelling through North Africa as tourists, the Hosali's found donkeys, mules and camels who were malnourished; weak; buckling under the weight of heavy loads; suffering with wounds inflicted by poorly fitting harnesses. To help these working animals, they founded SPANA to provide them with practical support and to promote the treatment of the animals with respect and kindness.

Initially the charity worked primarily in North African countries including Algeria, Tunisia and Morocco, before expanding into West and East Africa and even the Middle East.

SPANA's early history is described in the 1978 book Kate Who Was Called the Toubiba: The SPANA Story, by Nina Hosali.

In recent years, SPANA has expanded its work into southern Africa and, through local partnerships, also delivered projects across Asia, Africa and Central and South America.

In 2014, SPANA was selected as the charity of the year for Horse & Hound magazine to mark the publication’s 130th anniversary.

In 2016, SPANA launched International Working Animal Day. This annual event aims to raise awareness of the role played by working animals in low-income countries. 

SPANA was named 'Best Animal Welfare Charity' (for Europe, the Middle East and Africa) at the 2016 Animal Health Awards.

In 2018, SPANA campaigned against the increased threat to donkeys posed by the donkey skin trade and uncontrolled use of donkey skins to produce ejiao.

During the early months of the COVID-19 pandemic in 2020, SPANA's work was limited by local government lockdowns and health restrictions, while the accompanying decline of local businesses left many animal owners unable to work and struggling to look after or feed their animals. The group also ran a series of emergency feeding programmes in 2020 and 2021, which reached thousands of starving animals.

During the run-up to the COP26 climate summit in October 2021, SPANA highlighted the impact of climate change is having on working animals and the low-income communities they support.

In the Charity Film Awards 2022, SPANA won the People’s Choice Award (in the £5m-£20m turnover category), after gaining the most votes in the public vote. The charity’s film also received a Bronze award in the same category, voted for by a panel of judges.

In June 2022, a road in Mauritania was named Rue SPANA - SPANA Road - in recognition of the charity's contribution to animal welfare. The road's official inauguration ceremony was attended by local officials, including the Mayor of El Mina and the Chief of Police.

During the same month, SPANA signed an agreement with the government of Mauritania to confirm its involvement in a ‘Green Schools’ pilot project, to bring animal welfare lessons to about 60 schools in Mauritania. Students taking part in the new project were set to be taught about topics relating to the environment and sustainable development, and – in line with the UN animal welfare nexus resolution – will learn about the need for good animal welfare. For the initiative, SPANA has partnered with bodies including the Ministry of Education, the Ministry of Environment and Sustainability, the UNDP (United Nations Development Programme) and the German Development Corporation.

Today
As of 2022, SPANA has approximately 40 staff based in the charity's UK office and an additional 200 staff based overseas.

SPANA's senior leadership team is headed by Linda Edwards, the former CEO of United Purpose and Build Africa, who became Chief Executive of SPANA in August 2021. The charity's leadership team also includes Kit Vaughan (Director of Global Programmes), Linda Evans (Director of Global Animal Welfare), David Bassom (Director of Global Fundraising, Marketing and Communications) and Gita Patel (Director of Global Resources). SPANA's board of trustees is chaired by Mary-Lorraine Hughes.

Supporters
Notable supporters of the charity include Lady Odile Slynn and Rupert de Mauley, the current president of SPANA. Celebrity supporters of the charity include its Patron, John Craven, and ambassadors Peter Egan, Paul O'Grady, Brian Blessed, Dame Twiggy Lawson, Marc Abraham, James Greenwood and Jim Broadbent. Several of the charity's celebrity supporters lent their voices to a 2019 animated promo. Broadbent presented a programme about the work of SPANA on This Morning in March 2006.

References

External links
www.spana.org
Charity Commission

Conservation and environmental foundations
Animal charities based in the United Kingdom